Deng Chao (born 8 February 1979) is a Chinese actor, comedian, director and singer.  His recent films, The Breakup Guru (2014), The Mermaid (2016) and Duckweed (2017) are among the highest-grossing Chinese films of all time in China. In 2017, Deng was crowned Best Actor at the Golden Rooster Awards for his performance in The Dead End (2015). He was a cast member and leader of the popular variety program, Keep Running.

Career

Beginnings
During his third year of study at the Central Academy of Drama in Beijing, Deng achieved recognition from his performance in stage plays Cui Hua, Serve Suancai and  Please. After graduation, he started filming dramas. He rose to fame with the 2003 historical television series The Young Emperor and further achieved recognition in director Gao Xixi's military drama romance Happiness as Flowers.

2008–2010: Increasing recognition
Due to his rising popularity, Deng scored a role in Feng Xiaogang's war film Assembly. The film was well received by the audience and won critical acclaim. Deng won the Best Supporting Actor at the Hundred Flowers Awards, successfully making his crossover to the big screen. The same year, he co-starred in Cao Baoping's romantic thriller The Equation of Love and Death and was awarded the Society award at the Golden Phoenix Awards for his performance.

In 2010, he starred in Tsui Hark's action-mystery film Detective Dee and the Mystery of the Phantom Flame, playing an albino detective named Bei Dong Lai. He earned a Best Supporting Actor nomination at the Hong Kong Film Awards. Deng next starred in fantasy film Mural (2011), directed by Gordon Chan and adapted from the renowned ghost novel "Strange Stories from a Chinese Studio". In 2012, he signed on to play Cold Blood in The Four trilogy, based on Woon Swee Oan's novel series Si Da Ming Bu (The Four Great Constables).

2013–2015: Directorial works and Keep Running
In 2013, Deng starred as one of the three male leads in Peter Chan's film American Dreams in China, about three young men from poor backgrounds who achieved success by establishing a reputable English teaching school. The film was a commercial success and earned positive reviews. Taipei Times call the movie a "a well-executed work of entertainment that preaches about China's growing power" and praised Deng for "delivering a focused performance as an idealist with a defeated ego".

Deng made his directorial debut with The Breakup Guru (2014), a romantic comedy starring himself and Yang Mi. Though it faced stiff competition from Hollywood blockbusters, the film grossed 180 million yuan in its opening week and ended up as one of the highest-grossing films in China that year. The same year, he joined Keep Running, a remake of the South Korean variety program Running Man. Keep Running enjoyed explosive popularity in China. That year, Deng was chosen as the Most Valuable Chinese Actor.

Deng then starred in crime film The Dead End directed by acclaimed director Cao Baoping, and was praised by critics for "breathing life into the role with riveting performances", as well as his chemistry with co-star Duan Yihong. He shared the Best Actor award with co-stars Duan and Guo Tao at the 18th Shanghai International Film Festival, and won another Best Actor trophy at the Golden Rooster Awards. Deng teamed up again with Yu Baimei for the comedy film Devil and Angel, following the success of The Breakup Guru. However, unlike its predecessor, the film was voted the Most Disappointing Film of 2015 and received criticism for its poor approach to comedy.

2016–present: Success on the big screen
In 2016, Deng starred in renowned director Stephen Chow's film The Mermaid, where he plays a playboy businessman who falls in love with a mermaid that had been sent to assassinate him. The film was a success and broke box office sales record for a romantic drama film.

Due to his success on the big screen, CBN Weekly named him the 3rd most commercially valuable celebrity in China; and the most lucrative actor on China's big screen.

In 2017, Deng starred in Han Han's comedy film Duckweed, playing a rebellious car racer who thinks that his parents misunderstood him. The sleeper hit gained commercial and critical success. He next starred in the suspense crime film, The Liquidator, based on the bestselling crime novel series Evil Minds: City Light and directed by acclaimed TV director Xu Jizhou.

In 2018, Deng starred in Zhang Yimou's historical film, Shadow.

In 2019, Deng starred in the family drama film Looking Up, which he co-directed.

Personal life
Deng has been married to actress Sun Li since 2010. They have two children, a son named Deng Han Zhi and a daughter named Deng Han Yi.

Filmography

Film

Television series

Variety show

Discography

Awards and nominations

Forbes China Celebrity 100

References

External links

 Deng Chao on Sina Weibo

1979 births
Living people
People from Nanchang
Chinese male stage actors
Male actors from Jiangxi
21st-century Chinese male actors
Chinese male film actors
Chinese male television actors
Film directors from Jiangxi
Central Academy of Drama alumni